The Gang is a 2000 Malayalam-language crime thriller film directed and cinematographed by J. Williams. Vani Viswanath, Suvarna Mathew, Steffi, Jagadeesh, Spadikam George. The film is produced under the banner of Cochin Films.

Plot
The film is set against the backdrop of the popular beach resort, Kovalam. A drug racket run by a foreigner on the beach with the help of locals and a coast guard forms the crux of the film.

Cast

Vani Viswanath as Kathy Simon
Napoleon as Kevin
Baburaj as Joe
Suvarna Mathew as Merlyn
Steffi as Shyla
Spadikam George as Lifeguard 
Abu Salim as Lifeguard
Kalabhavan Mani as Stephen
Cochin Haneefa as Moosakka
Hemanth Ravan as Robert
Rizabawa as Aaron
Kazan Khan as Ajay
Chali Pala as Sub Inspector
Thalapathy Dinesh as Kamal
Mafia Sasi as Alan
N. L. Balakrishnan as News Reporter

Production 
In 1998, J. J. Williams came with Baburaj, the script writer, and narrated the film's story to Vani Viswanath, who found Baburaj's way of storytelling interesting. Viswanath was hesitant or not was to whether she would get paid for the film or not, so she asked Baburaj for her paycheck. When Baburaj had later asked her to return the money, Viswanath had lied that she had given it to her father. Vishwanath later fell in love with Baburaj and married him in November of 2002.

Legacy 
This was the first action film of Vani Viswanath, who later went on to establish herself as an action hero.

References

External links
 
 The Gang at the Malayalam Movie Database

2000s Malayalam-language films
2000 crime thriller films
2000 films
Indian crime thriller films